Wurmbea fluviatilis is a species of plant in the Colchicaceae family that is endemic to Australia. The specific epithet fluviatilis (‘riverine’) refers to the species' riverside habitat.

Description
The species is a cormous perennial herb that grows to a height of 15–55 cm. Its bicoloured dark pink and white to pale pink flowers appear from June to August in years when there has been sufficient rainfall.

Distribution and habitat
The species is found in the Gascoyne IBRA bioregion of north-western Western Australia. It grows in damp clay or sandy-clay soils on riverbanks, sometimes in water at the margins of shallow pools.

References

fluviatilis
Monocots of Australia
Flora of Western Australia
Plants described in 2011
Taxa named by Terry Desmond Macfarlane